«Public TV of Azov» (Priazov.tv) — an initiative of volunteer journalists of Pryazovia on creating first independent media in the region. It's the third most-popular Internet-channel of Mariupol 

Channel's goal is to give Mariupol and Azov region citizens an objective and unprejudiced information on political, economic, social issues. Its task is to fill information space of Azov region by informational and analytical articles and video-stories and to involve Mariupol citizens into process of solution of city problems.

History

Creation 
An idea of creation of an independent public TV-channel for Pryazovia appeared after Mariupol was liberated from DPR occupation. The idea came from Roman Skrypin's Hromadske.TV (Ukrainian - Громадське телебачення, literally - Public television).

Public TV of Azov aired for the first time on July, 19. The first guests were: a priest of the Kyivan patriarchy, the press-secretary of the Azov Battalion, and the organizator of the protests in Vradiyivka.

Parliamentary election of 2014 
During parliamentary election in 2014 Public TV of Azov hosted debates between candidates from Mariupol. It was the first ever debates in the city history.

The city of the heroes 
In December 2015 Public TV of Azov started project «The city of the heroes» - cycle of documentaries about Mariupol. Cycle was finished in August 2016 and consists of 10 films:
 Mariupol's self-defense unit
 From election to election
 Volunteer day
 Sector «M»
 After Minsk
 Black January
 First blood
 The new city power
 Start life again
 Ukraine is Mariupol

See also 
 Hromadske Radio
 Hromadske.TV
 Public television of Donbas
 Year of freedom. Mariupol after DNR

External links 
 Official website
 Facebook page
 YouTube channel

References 

Television stations in Ukraine
2014 establishments in Ukraine